John Riley Maxwell (July 16, 1871 – June 3, 1906) was an American golfer who competed in the 1904 Summer Olympics.

In 1904, Maxwell was part of the American team which won the silver medal. He finished 21st in this competition.

Maxwell won the inaugural Iowa Amateur in 1900 and the Trans-Mississippi Amateur in 1903.

Maxwell was inducted into the Iowa Golf Hall of Fame in 2011.

Maxwell died in Keokuk, Iowa.

References

External links
 
 
 

American male golfers
Amateur golfers
Olympic silver medalists for the United States in golf
Golfers at the 1904 Summer Olympics
Medalists at the 1904 Summer Olympics
Golfers from Iowa
1871 births
1906 deaths